Moallem is a surname of Persian and Arabic origins. Variations include Al-Moallem, and El-Moallem.
 Jasmin Moallem (born 1995), Israeli singer, songwriter, rapper and record producer
 Minoo Moallem (born 1954), Iranian-born American educator, author, and scholar

Surname variations 

Walid al-Moallem (1941–2020), Syrian diplomat and Ba'ath Party member
 Ibrahim El Moallem, Lebanese businessperson

See also 
 Moallem Kola, place name disambiguation page
 Moallem sani

Surnames of Arabic origin
Surnames of Iranian origin